The Wasserturm Mönchengladbach, also called Neuer Wasserturm, is one of the landmarks of Mönchengladbach.

Description 
The construction of the water tower was completed in 1909 within two years and the inauguration on took place on November 14, 1909. The cost for the construction was at that time 216,000 marks . The tower has a height of 51 meters and is located north of the city center on one of the main roads to Viersen . It was built in an Art Nouveau style according to the plans of the architect Otto Greiß , who wanted to make the tower a symbol of the city. The water tower suffered no damage during World War II.

The water tower has two tanks for drinking water supply to the city center and the northern districts of Mönchengladbach. The lower tank with a volume of about 2300 cubic meters supplied the lower areas of Mönchengladbach. The upper tank with a capacity of 800 cubic meters ensured the water supply of the Upper Town.

References

Further reading 
 Otto Greiß: Der neue Wasserturm in M.-Gladbach. In: Zentralblatt der Bauverwaltung, 30. Jahrgang 1910, Nr. 41 (vom 21. Mai 1910), S. 276 f.
 Gerd Lamers: Mönchengladbach. Auf den Spuren der Vergangenheit. Geiger, Horb am Neckar 1988, .

External links 

 Sightseeing in Mönchengladbach (Germ.)
 Monuments in Mönchengladbach (Germ.)

Towers completed in 1909
Water towers in Germany
Buildings and structures in Mönchengladbach